The 2009 UNCAF U-16 Tournament was the 3rd UNCAF U-16 Tournament, a biennial international football tournament contested by men's under-16 national teams.  Organized by UNCAF, the tournament took place in Costa Rica between 4 and 8 August 2009.

The matches were played at Estadio Ebal Rodríguez.  Five Central American teams took part of the tournament, playing each other in a round-robin format.  Honduras and Belize did not send a team.

Venue

Final standings

Results

References

External links
UNCAF Official Website

2009
2009 in youth association football
2009–10 in Costa Rican football
2009